The year 1595 in science and technology involved some significant events, some of which are listed here.

Chemistry
 Andreas Libavius publishes Opera omnia medico-chymica.

Exploration
 July 21 – A Spanish expedition led by Álvaro de Mendaña de Neira makes the first European landing in Polynesia, on the Marquesas Islands.
 Sir Walter Raleigh explores Guyana and eastern Venezuela.

Mathematics
 Bartholomaeus Pitiscus publishes Trigonometria: sive de solutione triangulorum tractatus brevis et perspicuus in Heidelberg, introducing the term trigonometry to Western European languages.

Medicine
 1595–1596 – Scipione (Girolamo) Mercurio publishes  ("The midwife"), the first text to advocate a Caesarean section on the living in cases of a contracted long pelvis.
 A first chair of medicine is created at Uppsala in Sweden.

Technology
 Hull of first fluyt laid in the Dutch Republic.

Births
 June 13 – Jan Marek Marci, Bohemian physician (died 1667).
 Cornelius Vermuyden, Dutch drainage engineer (died 1677).

Deaths
 August 24 – Thomas Digges, English astronomer (born 1546).
 November 12 – Sir John Hawkins, English navigator (born 1532) (at sea).

References

 
16th century in science
1590s in science